The Makuri Stream is a tributary of the Pātea River, in the upper catchment among the eastern Taranaki hill country.  The Makuri catchment falls entirely within the Stratford district, and takes in the settlements of Huinga, Huiroa and Kiore.

Geography

Access
The Makuri Valley has three different points of access from the populated west.  The southern end of the valley where the stream meets the Pātea River is accessed via Toko Road and the settlement of Huinga. State Highway 43 crosses the Makuri valley between the Douglas and Strathmore Saddles, where Walter Road gives access to the Makuri valley to the north, and Mangaotuku Road gives access to the south.  The upper parts of the catchment are reached via Douglas Road and the settlements of Huiroa and Kiore.

Land use
Nearly all of the catchment is cleared of bush, and is farmed predominantly as sheep and beef units.

Stratford District, New Zealand
Rivers of Taranaki
Rivers of New Zealand